A  is a bat used in aikido for strength and suburi training.  Despite being only  overall, with 10 inches for the handle, the "blade" is a large lump of rectangular wood, with its cross-section being a square with dimension of three square inches, and has an overall weight of 4 to 7 lbs. 

By designating one corner as edge, an aikidoka can use it as an even heavier suburitō, practice suburi, kata, hasuji (edge-angle) and tomei (swing stopping), and learn the bounce-back of the sword by practising against tenu-ichi, now typically a tyre stood upright on a concrete base.

As it is designed towards aikido and strength training, specifically for getting used to the weight of a heavy-handled object, it does not resemble a sword in shape, length, or mass. Thus, unlike suburito, it is less effective for learning the katana's cut, and is not suited for contact with other swords.

References

External links
Tanren Bo Training

Practice swords of Japan